The Europe Zone was one of the two regional zones of the 1935 International Lawn Tennis Challenge.

Due to increased political tensions in Europe, entries for the Europe Zone declined sharply, causing the Qualifying Round system to be scrapped. 11 teams entered the Europe Zone, with the winner going on to compete in the Inter-Zonal Final against the winner of the America Zone; 17 teams entering the qualifying rounds. Germany defeated Czechoslovakia in the final, and went on to face the United States in the Inter-Zonal Final.

Qualifying draw

Draw

First round

Poland vs. Belgium

Second round

Poland vs. Estonia

Germany vs. Romania

Sweden vs. Ireland

Netherlands vs. Monaco

Hungary vs. Norway

Qualifying round

Poland vs. Greece

Denmark vs. Germany

Sweden vs. Netherlands

Hungary vs. Yugoslavia

Main draw

Draw

First round

Netherlands vs. Japan

Czechoslovakia vs. Yugoslavia

Australia vs. New Zealand

Quarterfinals

Poland vs. South Africa

Czechoslovakia vs. Japan

France vs. Australia

Germany vs. Italy

Semifinals

Czechoslovakia vs. South Africa

Germany vs. Australia

Final

Czechoslovakia vs. Germany

References

External links
Davis Cup official website

Davis Cup Europe/Africa Zone
Europe Zone
International Lawn Tennis Challenge
1934 in tennis